The Sepang Racing Team (formerly known as SIC Racing Team) was a Malaysian Grand Prix motorcycle racing team which operated until the end of 2021, and was owned by the Sepang International Circuit. First established in 2015 in the Moto3 class and expanded in 2019, it fielded teams in MotoGP, Moto2 and Moto3 championships. The MotoGP team was formally called Petronas Yamaha Sepang Racing Team (Petronas Yamaha SRT), while the Moto2 and Moto3 teams were named Petronas Sprinta Racing Team (Petronas SRT).

Following the 2021 season, the MotoGP team became known as RNF MotoGP Racing, with Moto2 and Moto3 being disbanded. Several aspects and team members from the Moto3 crew were recruited by Michael Laverty  for his new VisionTrack Honda Moto3 team.

History
The team first raced in Moto2 in 2014, with former Grand Prix racer Johan Stigefelt launching his own outfit in the middleweight class using a Caterham bike and with backing from Malaysian airline Air Asia. Finishing sixth in the championship with Johann Zarco and Josh Herrin, the team then morphed into the Sepang International Circuit Team for the following season.

The team signed Malaysian rider Zulfahmi Khairuddin for their debut season in the lightweight class, joined by Czech racer Jakub Kornfeil. Kornfeil took two podium finishes for the team and finished 12th in the championship, while Khairuddin took a best finish of fifth at the Japanese Grand Prix. Kornfeil remained with the team for 2016, finishing the season in eighth and taking a podium finish at the team's home race in Malaysia. Adam Norrodin, signed to replace Khairuddin, ended the year 28th with a pair of 11th-place finishes his best results.

Retaining Norrodin and replacing Kornfeil with Japanese racer Ayumu Sasaki for 2017, the team ended the season 17th and 20th respectively. In October, they also announced a return to the Moto2 class for 2018, with Malaysian rider Hafizh Syahrin joining the squad. Releasing Syahrin early from his contract to take over Jonas Folger's Tech 3 Yamaha seat in MotoGP, Khairuddin returned to the team for the start of the season.

Retaining Sasaki and Norrodin for 2018, the pair finished the season in 20th and 21st, with Norrodin taking a best finish of fifth. Khairuddin was replaced on the team's Moto2 squad after five rounds by Finnish racer Niki Tuuli, who finished the year in 32nd with a best finish of 15th.

Expansion into MotoGP
In July 2018 it was announced that Sepang Racing Team would make the step up to the premier class for the  MotoGP season, with Yamaha providing leased Yamaha YZR-M1 motorcycles for the 2019, 2020 and 2021 MotoGP seasons. Signing French rookie Fabio Quartararo and Italian rider Franco Morbidelli and being joined by Petronas as title sponsor, the team became Petronas Yamaha SRT. The team expanded their partnership with Petronas further at the 2019 Dutch TT, when the Malaysian oil company also joined the team as technical partner, with the team switching to Petronas' Sprinta engine oil.

Retaining a presence in the Moto2 and Moto3 class, Malaysian rider Khairul Idham Pawi joined the team on their new Triumph-powered Kalex machine. In the Moto3 class, Sasaki remained alongside new signing John McPhee. McPhee gave the team their first ever Grand Prix victory at the French Grand Prix. The team also expanded into the new MotoE series, signing British racer Bradley Smith.

Following Petronas withdrawing its sponsorship at the end of 2021, the MotoGP team became known as RNF MotoGP Racing, with Moto2 and Moto3 being disbanded. A large part of the Moto3 operation was acquired by ex-racer Michael Laverty for a new team named Vision Track Honda to compete in the Moto3 World Championship with two British riders.

Grand Prix motorcycle results
(key) (Races in bold indicate pole position; races in italics indicate fastest lap)

Notes

References

External links

Moto Racing Team
Motorcycle racing teams
Motorcycle racing teams established in 2014
Motorcycle racing teams disestablished in 2021
Sports teams in Malaysia
2014 establishments in Malaysia
2021 disestablishments in Malaysia